The 2013 El Paso mayoral election was held on May 11 and June 8, 2013, to elect the Mayor of El Paso, Texas. Incumbent Mayor John Cook could not seek another term due to term limits. In the nonpartisan preliminary round was held on May 11, 2013, businessman Oscar Leeser and City Councilman Steve Ortega placed first and second with 47% and 21% of the vote, respectively, and because no candidate received a majority, a runoff election was held on June 15. Leeser won the runoff election.

First round

Candidates
 Oscar Leeser, automobile dealer
 Steve Ortega, city representative
 Robert Cormell, restaurateur
 Hector H. Lopez, radio host
 L. Gus Haddad, mortgage broker
 Jaime O. Perez, former chief of staff to El Paso County Judge Anthony Cobos
 Dean Martinez, retired military
 Jorge Artalejo, substitute teacher

Results

Runoff

Candidates
 Oscar Leeser, businessman
 Steve Ortega, City Councilman

Results

References

External links
 Robert Cormell for Mayor
 Gus Haddad for Mayor
 Hector Lopez for Mayor 
 Steve Ortega for Mayor

El Paso mayoral
El Paso
Mayoral elections in El Paso, Texas
Non-partisan elections